Will County is a county in the northeastern part of the state of Illinois. According to the 2020 census, it had a population of 696,355, an increase of 2.8% from 677,560 in 2010, making it Illinois's fourth-most populous county. The county seat is Joliet. Will County is one of the five collar counties of the Chicago-Naperville-Elgin, IL-IN-WI Metropolitan Statistical Area. The portion of Will County around Joliet uses area codes 815 and 779, while 630 and 331 are for far northern Will County and 708 is for central and eastern Will County.

History
Will County was formed on January 12, 1836, out of Cook and Iroquois Counties. It was named after Conrad Will, a politician and businessman involved in salt production in southern Illinois. Will was a member of the first Illinois Constitutional Convention and a member of the Illinois legislature until his death in 1835. Besides its present area, the county originally included the part of Kankakee County, Illinois, north of the Kankakee River. It lost that area when Kankakee County was organized in 1852. Since then its boundaries have not changed.

36 locations in Will County are on the National Register of Historic Places.

Geography

The Kankakee River, Du Page River and the Des Plaines River run through the county and join on its western border. The Illinois and Michigan Canal and the Chicago Sanitary and Ship Canal run through Will County.

A number of areas are preserved as parks (over  total) under the Forest Preserve District of Will County. The  Midewin National Tallgrass Prairie is a U.S. Forest Service park in the county on the grounds of the former Joliet Arsenal. Other parks include Channahon State Park and the Des Plaines Fish and Wildlife Area.

Climate and weather

Adjacent counties
 Kane County (northwest)
 DuPage County (north)
 Cook County (northeast)
 Lake County, Indiana (east)
 Kankakee County (south)
 Grundy County (southwest)
 Kendall County (west)

Demographics

As of the 2010 Census, there were 677,560 people, 225,256 households, and 174,062 families residing in the county. The racial makeup of the county was 76.0% white, 11.2% black or African American, 4.6% Asian, 0.3% American Indian, 5.8% from other races, and 2.3% from two or more races. Those of Hispanic or Latino origin made up 15.6% of the population. In terms of ancestry, 21.6% were German, 18.6% were Irish, 13.3% were Polish, 11.1% were Italian, 5.9% were English, and 2.1% were American.

Of the 225,256 households, 44.0% had children under 18 living with them, 61.9% were married couples living together, 10.9% had a female householder with no husband present, 22.7% were non-families, and 18.5% of all households were made up of individuals. The average household size was 2.97 and the average family size was 3.41. The median age was 35.4.

The median income for a household in the county was $75,906 and the median income for a family was $85,488. Males had a median income of $60,867 versus $40,643 for females. The per capita income was $29,811. About 5.0% of families and 6.6% of the population were below the poverty line, including 9.0% of those under 18 and 5.6% of those 65 or older.

Government
Will County is governed by a 22-member county board elected from 11 districts. Each district elects two members. The county executive, county clerk, coroner, auditor, treasurer, recorder of deeds, state's attorney, and sheriff are all elected in a countywide vote.

Politics
Like most of the collar counties, Will County was once a Republican stronghold. It went Republican in all but three elections from 1892 to 1988. Since the 1990s, it has become a swing county. It voted for the national winner in every presidential election from 1980 to 2012, but Chicago-born Hillary Clinton won it along with the rest of the "collar counties" aside from McHenry in 2016.

Education
 Governors State University is a 6,000-student public university in University Park.
 Lewis University is a 5,200-student four-year private university in Romeoville.
 University of St. Francis is a 3,300-student four-year private university in Joliet.
 The county is in Community College District 525 and is served by Joliet Junior College in Joliet. Joliet Junior College was the first two-year higher education institution in the United States.

K-12 school districts
K-12 school districts, including any with any territory in Will County, no matter how slight, even if the schools and/or administrative headquarters are in other counties:

K-12:
 Beecher Community Unit School District 200U
 Coal City Community Unit School District 1
 Crete-Monee Community Unit School District 201-U
 Indian Prairie Community Unit School District 204
 Manteno Community Unit School District 5
 Naperville Community Unit District 203
 Oswego Community Unit School District 308
 Peotone Community Unit School District 207U
 Plainfield School District 202
 Reed Custer Community Unit School District 255U
 Valley View Community Unit School District 365U
 Wilmington Community Unit School District 209U

Secondary:
 Bloom Township High School District 206
 Joliet Township High School District 204
 Lincoln Way Community High School District 210
 Lockport Township High School District 205
 Minooka Community High School District 111

Elementary:
 Chaney-Monge School District 88
 Channahon School District 17
 Elwood Community Consolidated School District 203
 Fairmont School District 89
 Frankfort Community Consolidated School District 157C
 Homer Community Consolidated School District 33C
 Joliet Public School District 86
 Laraway Community Consolidated School District 70C
 Lockport School District 91
 Manhattan School District 114
 Minooka Community Consolidated School District 201
 Mokena School District 159
 New Lenox School District 122
 Richland School District 88A
 Rockdale School District 84
 Steger School District 194;
 Summit Hill School District 161
 Taft School District 90
 Troy Community Consolidated School District 30C
 Union School District 81
 Will County School District 92

Transportation
Will County is served by four U.S. interstate highways, four U.S. highways, and 12 Illinois highways.

Major highways

  Interstate 55
  Interstate 57
  Interstate 80
  Interstate 355
  U.S. Highway 6
  U.S. Highway 30
  U.S. Highway 45
  U.S. Highway 52
  U.S. Highway 66
  Illinois Route 1
  Illinois Route 7
  Illinois Route 43
  Illinois Route 50
  Illinois Route 53
  Illinois Route 59
  Illinois Route 102
  Illinois Route 113
  Illinois Route 126
  Illinois Route 129
  Illinois Route 171
  Illinois Route 394

Rail
Four different Metra commuter rail lines (Metra Electric Main Line, Southwest Service, Rock Island District and Heritage Corridor) connect Will County with the Chicago Loop.

Energy infrastructure

Pipelines
Will County is a major hub in the national natural gas pipeline grid where pipelines from Canada and the Gulf of Mexico meet and then fan out to serve the Midwest. The following major energy companies own pipeline that runs through Will County:
 Alliance Pipeline
 Enbridge
 Integrys Energy Group
 Peoples Gas
 Kinder Morgan Interstate Gas Transmission
 TransCanada
 ANR Pipeline - Fully owned & operated
 Northern Border Pipeline - Partially owned & fully operated
 Vector Pipeline

Joliet Refinery
ExxonMobil owns and operates the Joliet Refinery along the Des Plaines River just east of I-55. According to ExxonMobil, the refinery employs about 600 people and was constructed in 1972.

Municipalities
The municipalities with their population within Will County and their total population as of the 2010 census are:

Cities

 Aurora – 11,471 (total 197,899; mostly in DuPage, Kane and Kendall counties)
 Braidwood – 6,191
 Crest Hill – 20,837
 Joliet – 137,684 (total 147,433; partly in Kendall County)
 Lockport – 24,839
 Naperville – 47,320 (total 141,853; mostly in DuPage County)
 Wilmington – 5,724

Villages

 Beecher – 4,359
 Bolingbrook – 71,795 (total 73,366; partly in DuPage County)
 Braceville – 1 (total 793; mostly in Grundy County)
 Channahon – 9,345 (total 12,560; partly in Grundy County)
 Coal City – 2 (total 5,587; mostly in Grundy County)
 Crete – 8,259
 Diamond – 19 (total 2,527; mostly in Grundy County)
 Elwood – 2,279
 Frankfort – 17,782 (total 17,789; partly in Cook County)
 Godley – 552 (total 601; partly in Grundy County)
 Homer Glen – 24,220
 Lemont – 3 (total 16,000; mostly in Cook and DuPage counties)
 Manhattan – 10,084
 Matteson – 0 (total 19,009; mostly in Cook County)
 Minooka – 1,803 (total 10,924; mostly in Grundy and Kendall counties)
 Mokena – 18,740
 Monee – 5,148
 New Lenox – 24,394
 Orland Park – 184 (total 56,767; mostly in Cook County)
 Park Forest – 3,303 (total 21,975; mostly in Cook County)
 Peotone – 4,142
 Plainfield – 37,502 (total 39,581; partly in Kendall County)
 Rockdale – 1,976
 Romeoville – 39,680
 Sauk Village – 0 (total 10,506; mostly in Cook County)
 Shorewood – 15,615
 Steger – 5,467 (total 9,570; partly in Cook County)
 Symerton – 87
 Tinley Park – 7,467 (total 56,703; mostly in Cook County)
 University Park – 6,856 (total 7,129; partly in Cook County)
 Woodridge – 22 (total 32,971; mostly in DuPage County)

Census-designated places

 Andres
 Arbury Hills
 Ballou
 Bonnie Brae
 Crystal Lawns – 1,830
 Custer Park
 Eagle Lake
 Fairmont – 2,389
 Frankfort Square – 8,968
 Goodenow
 Goodings Grove (former CDP)
 Ingalls Park – 3,460
 Lakewood Shores – 665
 Lockport Heights
 Lorenzo
 Marley
 Plum Valley
 Polk
 Preston Heights – 2,898
 Rest Haven
 Ridgewood
 Ritchie
 Sunnyland
 Willow Brook Estates – 1,346
 Wilton
 Wilton Center

Forts
 Fort Beggs

Townships
The 24 townships of Will County, with their populations as of the 2010 census, are:

 Channahon – 10,322
 Crete – 23,774
 Custer – 1,430
 DuPage – 87,793
 Florence – 933
 Frankfort – 57,055
 Green Garden – 4,010
 Homer – 39,059
 Jackson – 4,100
 Joliet – 87,398
 Lockport – 60,010
 Manhattan – 11,545
 Monee – 15,669
 New Lenox – 40,270
 Peotone – 4,431
 Plainfield – 80,318
 Reed – 6,948
 Troy – 45,991
 Washington – 6,263
 Wesley – 2,241
 Wheatland – 81,472
 Will – 1,821
 Wilmington – 6,193
 Wilton – 841

See also

References
Specific

General

External links

 
 Will County Board

 
1836 establishments in Illinois
Chicago metropolitan area
Illinois counties
Populated places established in 1836